Okazaki Central Park General Gymnasium is a multi-purpose arena in Okazaki, Aichi, Japan.

Facilities
Gymnasium 2,646m2（63m×42m）
Budokan 1,722m2
Dojo1 540m2 
Dojo2 540m2
Training room
Running course 120m

Gallery

References

External links
Okazaki Chuo Sogo Park

Basketball venues in Japan
Indoor arenas in Japan
SeaHorses Mikawa
Sports venues in Aichi Prefecture
Sports venues completed in 1991
1991 establishments in Japan
Okazaki, Aichi